Calvi dell'Umbria is a comune (municipality) in the Province of Terni in the Italian region Umbria, located about 80 km south of Perugia and about 20 km southwest of Terni.

The area was inhabited in Roman times, but developed as an urban center only in the High Middle Ages. Calvi was a fief of the Orsini and then of the Anguillara families.

Among the main attractions are:
Santa Maria Assunta: Church with a late Renaissance baptismal font
San Antonio: Church with a detailed 16th century (presepe) Nativity display
Santa Brigida monastery and church: Formerly an Ursuline order convent, now a civic museum of religious art and life; the church built by Ferdinando Fuga in late-baroque style

Twin towns
 Peiting, Germany

References

Cities and towns in Umbria